(commonly referred to as simply Suntory) is a Japanese multinational brewing and distilling company group. Established in 1899, it is one of the oldest companies in the distribution of alcoholic beverages in Japan, and makes Japanese whisky. Its business has expanded to other fields, and the company now also makes soft drinks and operates sandwich chains. With its 2014 acquisition of Beam, Inc., it has diversified internationally and become the third largest maker of distilled beverages in the world. Suntory is headquartered in Dojimahama 2-chome, Kita-ku, Osaka, Osaka Prefecture. , a subsidiary of Suntory, is responsible for development outside Japan.

History
In 1907, the store began selling a fortified wine called Akadama Port Wine (Akadama literally meaning "red ball," a euphemism for the sun). The store became the Kotobukiya company in 1921 to further expand its business and in 1923, Torii built Japan's first malt whisky distillery Yamazaki Distillery. Production began in December 1924 and five years later Suntory Whisky Shirofuda (White Label), the first single malt whisky made in Japan, was sold.

Due to shortages during World War II, Kotobukiya was forced to halt its development of new products, but in 1946 it re-released Torys Whisky, which sold well in post-war Japan. In 1961, Kotobukiya launched the "Drink Torys and Go to Hawaii" campaign. At the time, a trip abroad was considered a once-in-a-lifetime opportunity. In 1963, Kotobukiya changed its name to "Suntory", taken from the name of the whisky it produces, which itself was derived from the English "Sun" (referencing "akadama") + Tory, the anglicized version of Torii's name. In the same year, Musashino Beer Factory began its production of the Suntory Beer. In 1997, the company became Japan's sole bottler, distributor, and licensee of Pepsi products.

On July 14, 2009, Kirin announced that it was negotiating with Suntory on a merger. On February 8, 2010, it was announced that negotiations between the two were terminated.

In 2009, Suntory acquired Orangina, the orange soft drink for 300 billion yen, and Frucor energy drinks for 600 million euros. On July 2, 2013 the company debuted on the Tokyo stock exchange and raised almost US$4 billion in the process.

In September 2013, Suntory purchased the drinks division of GlaxoSmithKline. This included the brands Lucozade and Ribena, however, the deal did not include Horlicks.

In January 2014, Suntory announced an agreement to buy the largest U.S. bourbon producer, Beam Inc. (producers of Jim Beam) for US$16 billion. This deal would make Suntory the world's third largest spirits maker. The acquisition was completed in April 2014, when it was announced that Beam would be renamed Beam Suntory.

In 2018, Suntory sold most of Cerebos Pacific assets, including Australian and New Zealand food business to Kraft Heinz for A$290 million. This transaction excludes Cerebos Pacific's health supplements and fresh coffee business which later integrated into Suntory Beverage & Food Asia Pte. Ltd. and Suntory Coffee Australia respectively.

Holdings

Beam Suntory
Florigene Pty Ltd
Frucor Beverages Limited
Gold Knoll Ltd
Grupo Restaurante Suntory Mexico
Morrison Bowmore Distillers, Limited
Orangina
Pepsi Bottling Ventures LLC
Subway Japan
Tipco F&B Co., Ltd
Suntory Beverage & Food Asia Pte. Ltd.
Suntory PepsiCo Vietnam Beverage Co., Ltd (joint venture with PepsiCo)
Château Lagrange S.A.S 
Louis Royer S.A.S, sold in 2015

Joint ventures

From the early 1990s, Suntory has collaborated extensively with Melbourne biotechnology firm Florigene to genetically engineer the world's first true blue rose, a symbol often associated with the impossible or unattainable. In 1991, the team won the intense global race to isolate the gene responsible for blue flowers, and has since developed a range of genetically modified flowers expressing colors in the blue spectrum, as well as a number of other breakthroughs extending the vase life of cut flowers.

In 2003, Suntory acquired a 98.5% equity holding in Florigene. Prior to this, Florigene had been a subsidiary of global agrochemicals giant Nufarm since 1999. In July 2004, Suntory and Florigene scientists announced to the world the development of the first roses containing blue pigment, an important step toward the creation of a truly blue colored rose.

In July 2011, Suntory Beverage and Food Limited together with PT GarudaFood from Tudung Group in Indonesia have agreed to make a new firm to produce non-alcoholic drink with 51 percent and 49 percent shares respectively. It will produce Suntory Oolong Tea, Boss and Orangina.

In April 2019 Suntory partnered with Drinkripples, an Israeli-based company. As part of the collaboration Suntory will use Drinkripples' Ripple Maker machines to print branded and viral content on top of Suntory beer in Suntory certified locations and factories throughout Japan.

Media and advertising

 Suntory and its various products are featured in the Yakuza series of games.
 Suntory was one of the first East Asian companies to specifically employ American celebrities to market their product. One of the most notable is Sammy Davis, Jr., who appeared in a series of Suntory commercials in the early 1970s. In the late 1970s, Akira Kurosawa directed a series of commercials featuring American celebrities on the set of his film Kagemusha. One of these featured Francis Ford Coppola (an executive producer of the film), which later inspired his daughter Sofia Coppola in her writing of Lost in Translation, a film which focuses on an American actor (played by Bill Murray) filming a Suntory commercial in Tokyo. 
 A Reuters photo by Toshiyuki Aizawa from July 2003 showed Suntory's marketing strategy of TV helmets. In this scheme, advertising company employees clad in orange jumpsuits wear television cameras that broadcast wide-screen digital feeds of the brewing company's  commercial on top of their helmets.
In the 1980s, Suntory released a new type of product called "Suntory CAN Beer". To promote the product, Suntory created penguin characters that would be singing, provided by Seiko Matsuda. The ads were popular, and as a result, Suntory created a film about the penguins called "Penguin's Memory: A Tale of Happiness".
 Suntory operates two museums, the Suntory Museum of Art in Tokyo and the Suntory Museum Tempozan in Osaka, in addition to a number of cultural and social programs across Japan.
 In the 1970s, Suntory engaged the US pop group the Carpenters to advertise its new line of soft drinks.
 Suntory is a former sponsor of the professional match play golf tournament, played annually at Wentworth Club, near London.

Products

Alcoholic drinks

Soft drinks

Food for specified health uses

The following drinks were approved as Food for Specified Health Uses (FOSHU).

Black Oolong Tea
Sesame Barley Tea

See also
Suntory Sungoliath rugby team – champions of the 2007-08 Top League (fifth season)
Suntory Mermaid II – wave powered catamaran
Suntory Sunbirds

References

External links

Yahoo! - Suntory Group company profile
Yahoo! - Suntory Limited company profile

 
Beer in Japan
Holding companies established in 1899
Japanese brands
Holding companies of Japan
Midori-kai
Companies listed on the Tokyo Stock Exchange
PepsiCo bottlers
Drink companies of Japan
Wineries of Japan
Japanese companies established in 1899
Food and drink companies established in 1899